Juliusz Zarębski (3 March 185415 September 1885) was a Polish composer and pianist. Some of his manuscripts have been found in the National Library of Poland (BN).

Life
Juliusz Zarębski was born on March 3, 1854, in Zhytomyr, now Ukraine (then former lands of the Polish–Lithuanian Commonwealth and the Polish Kingdom). He would die in the same city in 1885.

His mother was his first piano teacher. In 1870, he completed his education at the gymnasium with honors and moved to Vienna to study composition with Franz Krenn and piano with Josef Dachs. Two years later, he graduated with two gold medals, even though his curriculum indicated a musical training of six years. The following year he moved to St. Petersburg and studied there for three more years, passed his examination and obtained his diploma of "free artist." A year later, he moved to Rome and stayed there until 1875. In Rome, he studied piano with Franz Liszt, his friend for some time. The Hungarian composer, who would orchestrate his Danses Galiciennes in 1881, greatly helped Zarębski, appearing with him in concerts and using his contacts to publicize the works of the Polish composer.

Zarębski's compositions evoke those of Liszt and Chopin. He set to music the writings of Adam Mickiewicz and Włodzimierz Wolski.

Career
His career as a virtuoso pianist began in spring 1874 with concerts in Odessa and Kiev. His performances in Rome, Naples, Constantinople, Warsaw, Paris, London and other European cities were a great success. He was interested in the two piano keyboards, a new invention of Edouard Mangeot, which in two months mastered. He developed his repertoire in this new instrument and performed on it with great acclaim in the 1878 Paris Exhibition. He established himself in Brussels, where he served as teacher of piano master classes at the Royal Conservatory. Two years before his death he had to put an end to his career as a virtuoso as he was diagnosed with tuberculosis, throwing himself into teaching (he had been appointed professor at the Royal Conservatory of Brussels in 1880) and composing pieces such as the five movements of Les roses et les épines based on a more advanced harmony. Though he continued composing nearly exclusively for the piano, the summit of his output would be his cyclical Piano Quintet in G minor of 1885.

Compositions for piano
The parenthetical remarks indicate place and date of publication. "BN" indicates an unpublished manuscript found in the National Library of Poland.

 Andante ma non troppo, (BN)
 Romance sans paroles, in F minor, ca. 1870, (BN)
 Adieu, in F minor, ca. 1870, (BN)
 Maria, Piano 4-hands, 1871, (BN)
 March, pf 4 hands, 1875
 Grande fantaisie, 1876
 Menuet, Op. 1, 3 danses galiciennes, piano 4-hands, Op. 2 (Berlin 1880)
 Concert étude, in G major, Op. 3 (Berlin 1879)
 4 Mazurkas, pf 4 hands, Op. 4 (Berlin 1880)
 2 morceaux en forme de mazurka, piano 4-hands, Op. 5 (Berlin 1881)
 Grande polonaise, in F major, Op. 6 (Berlin 1881)
 3 études de concert, Op. 7 (Mainz 1881)
 Concert-mazurka, in C minor, Op. 8 (Mainz 1882)
 Fantaisie polonaise, Op. 9, ca. 1877 (Mainz 1882)
 Polonaise mélancolique, Op. 10 (Mainz 1882)
 Polonaise triomphale, Piano 4-hands, Op. 11 (Mainz 1882)
 Divertissement à la polonaise, Piano 4-hands, Op. 12 (Mainz 1883)
 Les roses et les épines, Op. 13 (Mainz 1883)
 Impromptu-caprice, Op. 14 (Leipzig 1883)
 Mazurka de concert, No.2, G minor, Op. 15 (Leipzig 1883)
 Suite polonaise, Op. 16 (Leipzig 1883)
 Valse sentimentale, Op. 17 (Leipzig 1884)
 Ballade, in G minor, Op. 18 (Wrocław 1884)
 Novellette-caprice, Op. 19 (Wrocław 1884)
 Sérénade burlesque, Op. 20 (Wrocław 1884)
 Berceuse, Op. 22 (Leipzig 1884)
 A travers Pologne, Piano 4-hands, Op. 23 (Wrocław 1884) 
 Valse-caprice, Op. 24 (Leipzig 1884)
 Tarantelle, Op. 25 (Leipzig 1885?)
 Sérénade espagnole, Op. 26 (Leipzig 1883)
 Etrennes, Op. 27 (Wrocław 1885)
 Polonaise, Op. 28 (Leipzig 1885)
 Gavotte, Op. 29 (Leipzig 1885)
 Valse, Op. 30 (Leipzig 1885)
 Barcarolle, Op. 31 (Leipzig 1885)
 Menuet, Op. 32 (Mainz 1885)
 Piano Quintet,'' in G minor, for 2 violins, viola, cello and piano, Op. 34, 1885 (Warszawa 1931)

References

Citations

Sources

External links

 Scores by Juliusz Zarębski in digital library Polona

1854 births
1885 deaths
19th-century classical composers
19th-century classical pianists
19th-century male musicians
19th-century musicians
19th-century deaths from tuberculosis
Polish Romantic composers
Polish male classical composers
Polish classical pianists
Male classical pianists
Academic staff of the Royal Conservatory of Brussels
Musicians from Zhytomyr
People from Zhitomirsky Uyezd
Tuberculosis deaths in Ukraine
Polish composers